MBK Center, also known as Mahboonkrong, is a large shopping mall in Bangkok, Thailand. At eight storeys, the center contains around 2,000 shops, restaurants and service outlets.

In 2009, MBK Center management reported daily visitor numbers of more than 100,000, half of whom were young Thai people and a third foreign visitors.

History
MBK was the largest shopping mall in Asia when it opened in 1985. It is on land leased from the adjacent Chulalongkorn University. This lease was renewed in 2002. MBK was named after the parents of the developer Sirichai Bulakul, Mah and Boonkrong, whose statues are found on the ground floor.

Anchor 

 Don Don Donki
 Tops
 Supersports Factory Outlet
 7-Eleven
 Kudsan Bakery & Coffee
 SF Cinema 8 Cinemas (Cinecafe 1 Cinema)
 Food Legends By MBK
 BNK48 Digital Live Studio (Moved From EmQuartier)
 BNK48 Cafe (Old Thai-Denmark Milk Land and Moved From The Mall Bangkapi)
 Pathumwan Princess Hotel
 Thanachart Bank (Head Office)
 Animate Bangkok (Japan Manga Alliance)

Location
MBK Center is in Pathum Wan District, on the southwest corner of the intersection of Rama I Road and Phaya Thai Road. It is close to Siam Square, which can be reached from the second floor via a covered pedestrian bridge over Phaya Thai Road, and Siam Center and Siam Paragon, which are across Rama I Road from Siam Square. The mall is next to National Stadium.

Transportation
 BTS Skytrain - National Stadium BTS Station; also within walking distance of Siam station.
 Khlong Saen Saep - Hua Chang pier is within walking distance.

Layout

Department store
The Don Don Donki discount store is at the north end of MBK Center.

Hotel
The Pathumwan Princess Hotel is at the south end of MBK Center.

Sport activity 
MBK Fight Night

References

External links

 MBK Shopping Center Overview
 
 MBK Center Floor Arrangement

Shopping malls in Bangkok
Pathum Wan district
Shopping malls established in 1985
1985 establishments in Thailand
Property Management of Chulalongkorn University
Bulakul family